Belinda Jane Vernon (born 1958) is a former New Zealand politician. She was an MP from 1996 to 2002, representing the National Party.

Early life
Vernon attended Remuera Intermediate School (1970–71) and Diocesan School for Girls (1972–76). She gained a BComm from the University of Auckland. She commenced her professional life as an accountant for a London shipping company. Back in New Zealand, she became financial controller, and then company secretary, for a trans-Tasman shipping company.

Member of Parliament

The voters of the Auckland seat of Maungakiekie elected Vernon as their electorate Member of Parliament in the 1996 election, but she lost the seat to Labour's Mark Gosche in the 1999 election, returning to Parliament as a list MP. In the 2002 election she failed to re-take Maungakiekie, and owing to the collapse of National's vote that year, was not high enough on the party list to return to Parliament.

From 2001, Vernon served as National's spokesperson for Transport and for Arts, Culture and Heritage.

After politics
Vernon was a trustee of the Motutapu Restoration Trust from 2002–2012.  On 1 July 2011 she was appointed as a director at GNS Science.  On 27 February 2013 she was appointed to the board of Maritime New Zealand.

References

1958 births
Living people
New Zealand National Party MPs
Women members of the New Zealand House of Representatives
New Zealand list MPs
Members of the New Zealand House of Representatives
New Zealand MPs for Auckland electorates
University of Auckland alumni
Unsuccessful candidates in the 2002 New Zealand general election
People educated at Diocesan School for Girls, Auckland
21st-century New Zealand politicians
21st-century New Zealand women politicians